Beng (Ben) is a Mande language of Ivory Coast. The Ngen dialect, perhaps a closely related language, is spelled various ways, including Gan, Ngain, Ngan, Ngin, Nguin.

Paperno describes Beng and Gbin as two primary branches of Southern Mande.

References

External links
 Grammatical sketch of Beng

Mande languages
Languages of Ivory Coast